WEGX (92.9 FM) is a country music station licensed to Dillon, South Carolina and serves the Florence and Myrtle Beach areas. The iHeartMedia outlet is licensed by the Federal Communications Commission (FCC) to broadcast with an effective radiated power (ERP) of 100,000 watts. The station goes by the name Eagle 92.9 and its current slogan is "Today's Country."  Its studios are in Florence, and the transmitter is located at WBTW's nearly 2000-foot tower in Dillon County northeast of Florence.

History of WEGX, Philadelphia

The WEGX call letters were formerly on Philadelphia's "Eagle 106," and was owned by Malrite Communications Group. The format was "Churban," a hybrid of the contemporary hit radio (CHR) and urban formats with a target demographic in the teens to early 20s, with a focus on dance music. Danny Bonaduce, formerly of the Partridge Family and talk show host, was one of the station's well-known personalities, second to John Lander and the "Nut Hut". On March 12, 1993, the station changed its format to Jazz. The call letters changed to WJJZ, Smooth Jazz 106, on March 22. WJJZ is also now defunct. The station is currently known as "The Breeze".

During the early 1990s WEGX had a great run in the Philadelphia market.  Some notable talent that were involved with the station: Brian Philips (President of CMT as of 2008), Jay Beau Jones, Brian Murphy, Gary Leigh, Max Viera, Welch & Woody, Rumble & Thrower, John Lander, Danny Bonaduce, Lucy St. James, Spyder Harrison, Cadillac Jack, JoJo, Daryle Lee (Party Patrol), Sean Caldwell and Karen Clauss (news).

History of WEGX, Dillon

For many years Eagle 92.9 had the call letters WDSC-FM. The format was adult contemporary in the 1980s when WDSC-FM became WZNS Z-92.9 and increased its signal power, already at 100,000 watts, by moving to one of the area's tallest towers, the one already used by WPDE-TV.

WZNS "Z93" played classic rock in the early 1990s. During the summer of 1993, WRCQ owner Metropolitan Broadcasting managed the station and aired the same programming on WZNS and WRCQ. In November, WZNS went off the air. Leading up to the switch in format, the station engaged in several stunts meant to attract attention,  such as broadcasting the sound of chickens clucking, bouncing balls, barking dogs, running water, and a computerized countdown from 32,084. After the switch to country in 1994, billboards and newspaper ads advised people "Do not listen to 92.9 FM."

Eagle 92.9 announced a move to studios in Fayetteville, North Carolina later that year. Owner Beasley Broadcasting also owned Fayetteville country station WKML.

The station did not do well in Fayetteville, and after 5 months, the station moved back to Dillon. On July 2, 1997, three years after buying the station, Beasley announced it would sell WEGX. Root Communications of Daytona Beach owned several stations in the Florence, South Carolina and Myrtle Beach, South Carolina markets, areas where Beasley had not succeeded in buying radio stations.

Qantum Communications Inc. purchased Florence's Root Communications Group LP stations in 2003.

With Qantum Communications once again concentrating their efforts on the Florence market and surrounding Pee Dee Region, the station quickly ascended to the top of the Arbitron rankings and has held its position consistently over the years, finishing second only to contemporary urban station WYNN 106.3. The station plays host to all MRN and PRN broadcasts as the official home for NASCAR in the region.

On May 15, 2014, Qantum Communications announced that it would sell its 29 stations, including WEGX, to Clear Channel Communications (now iHeartMedia), in a transaction connected to Clear Channel's sale of WALK AM-FM in Patchogue, New York to Connoisseur Media via Qantum. The transaction was consummated on September 9, 2014.

See also
WUMR (FM)

References

External links

Myrtle Beach, South Carolina
EGX
IHeartMedia radio stations
Country radio stations in the United States
Radio stations established in 1954
1954 establishments in South Carolina